Melancholy may refer to:
 Melancholia, one of the four temperaments in pre-modern medicine and proto-psychology, representing a state of low mood
 Depression (mood), a state of low mood, also known as melancholy
 Major depressive disorder, a mood disorder historically called melancholy

Arts and books
 Melancholy (novel), a 1995 novel by Jon Fosse
 Melancholy (Edvard Munch), an 1891–1893 series of paintings by Edvard Munch
 Melancholy (Francesco Hayez), an 1840-1841 painting by Francesco Hayez

Music
 Melancholy (album), a 1999 live free jazz album by Cecil Taylor's Workshop Ensemble
 "Melancholy" (song), an environmental song by 365 Nepali artists 2017
 Melancholy (documentary), a 2018 documentary based on environmental research studies of the regions of Nepal from 2013 to 2018
 "Melancolie", a 1983 Moldovan song written by Grigore Vieru
 "Melancholy", a 1998 song by Iced Earth from the album Something Wicked This Way Comes
 "Melancholy", a 2017 song by the rapper Murs
 "Melancholy", a 2009 song by Timothy B. Schmit from the album Expando
 Mellon Collie And The Infinite Sadness, a 1995 alternative rock album by The Smashing Pumpkins.

See also
 Melancholia (disambiguation)
 La Malinconia (disambiguation)